The 1964–65 Irish Cup was the 85th edition of the premier knock-out cup competition in Northern Irish football. 

Coleraine won the cup for the 1st time, defeating Glenavon 2–1 in the final at Windsor Park. 

The holders Derry City were knocked out by Linfield in the quarter-finals.

Results

First round

|}

Replay

|}

Second replay

|}

Quarter-finals

|}

Replay

|}

Second replay

|}

Semi-finals

|}

Replay

|}

Final

References

External links
The Rec.Sport.Soccer Statistics Foundation - Northern Ireland - Cup Finals

Irish Cup seasons
1964–65 in Northern Ireland association football
1964–65 domestic association football cups